Grantham & Rose is a 2014 American independent coming of age drama film directed by Kristin Hanggi and starring Jake T. Austin and Marla Gibbs.  It is Hanggi's directorial debut.  Michael Urie and Mark Lee served as an executive producers of the film.

Plot

Grantham (Jake T. Austin) struggles to become a man when a spontaneous road trip places him in the care of an 81-year-old African-American woman named Rose (Marla Gibbs).

Cast
 Jake T. Austin as Grantham Portnoy
 Marla Gibbs as Rose Price
 Tessa Thompson as Wallis
 Ryan Spahn as Erik Henry
 Lisa Winters II as Sherrie Portnoy

Production
On August 2, 2012, it was announced that Gibbs would be cast opposite Austin in the film.  Filming began in Georgia in August 2012.

Release and reception
MarVista Entertainment released Grantham & Rose on February 10, 2015.  The film premiered on Netflix on August 21, 2015.

References

External links
 
 

2014 films
2010s coming-of-age drama films
Films shot in Georgia (U.S. state)
American coming-of-age drama films
American independent films
2014 directorial debut films
2014 independent films
2010s English-language films
2010s American films